Abbasabad District is a former district (bakhsh) of Tonekabon County, Mazandaran Province, Iran. At the 2006 census, its population was 45,589, in 12,694 families.  The district had three cities: Salman Shahr, Abbasabad, and Kelarabad. The area of the district was detached from Tonekabon County and established as Abbasabad County.

References 

Abbasabad County
Tonekabon County
Former districts of Iran
Districts of Mazandaran Province